La Boquilla Dam (Spanish: Presa de la Boquilla) is a masonry arch-gravity dam on the Rio Conchos in Chihuahua, Mexico. The dam and the nearby town of Boquilla de Conchos are named for the abrupt narrowing of the Conchos valley where the dam was built: boquilla means "nozzle" or "mouth".

Construction began in 1910 and was completed in 1915. The dam has overflowed several times throughout its history, most notably in 1917 and 2008, causing severe flooding downstream.

The power plant at the dam has a generating capacity of 25 megawatts. In 2004 it produced 164,660,000 kilowatt hours of energy.

One demonstrator was killed and another injured in September 2020 during a protest by farmers against sending water from La Boquilla Dam to the United States as stipulated in a treaty signed in 1944 relating to the utilization of waters of the Colorado and Tijuana Rivers and of the Rio Grande. Locals blamed the Mexican National Guard, who responded they did not do it and that the event needed to be investigated.

The National Guard later withdrew from the site.

See also
Lago Colina Dam
List of dams and reservoirs#Mexico
List of lakes in Mexico

References

Dams in Mexico
Dams completed in 1915
Masonry dams
Arch-gravity dams